Paralimni Stadium is a multi-purpose stadium in Paralimni, Cyprus.  It is currently used mostly for football matches and is the home ground of Enosis Neon Paralimni.  The stadium holds 5,800 people.

Athletics (track and field) venues in Cyprus
Football venues in Cyprus
Multi-purpose stadiums in Cyprus
Buildings and structures in Famagusta District